

Events

January

 January 1
 The Syrian Federation is officially dissolved, the State of Aleppo and the State of Damascus having been replaced by the State of Syria.
 January 3 – Benito Mussolini makes a pivotal speech in the Italian Chamber of Deputies. Historians now trace the beginning of Mussolini's dictatorship to this speech.
 January 5 – Nellie Tayloe Ross becomes the first female governor (Wyoming) in the United States. Twelve days later, Ma Ferguson becomes first female governor of Texas.
 January 25 – Hjalmar Branting resigns as Prime Minister of Sweden because of ill health, and is replaced by the minister of trade, Rickard Sandler.
 January 27–February 1 – The 1925 serum run to Nome (the "Great Race of Mercy") relays diphtheria antitoxin by dog sled across the U.S. territory of Alaska, to combat an epidemic.

February

 February 25 – Art Gillham records (for Columbia Records) the first Western Electric masters to be commercially released.
 February 28 – The 1925 Charlevoix–Kamouraska earthquake strikes northeastern North America.

March

 March 1 New York City Fire Department Rescue 2 is put in service in Brooklyn.
 March 4
 İsmet İnönü is appointed prime minister in Turkey (Turkey's 4th and İnönü's 3rd government).
 Calvin Coolidge is sworn in for a full term as President of the United States, in the first inauguration to be broadcast on radio.
 March 6 – Pionerskaya Pravda, one of the oldest children's newspapers in Europe, is founded in the Soviet Union.
 March 9–May 1 – Pink's War: The British Royal Air Force bombards mountain strongholds of Mahsud tribesmen in South Waziristan.
 March 15 – The Phi Lambda Chi fraternity (original name "The Aztecs") is founded on the campus of Arkansas State Teachers' College in Conway, Arkansas (now the University of Central Arkansas).
 March 16 – At 22:42 local time a 7.0 earthquake shakes the Chinese province of Yunnan killing 5,000 people.
 March 18 – The Tri-State Tornado, the deadliest in U.S. history, rampages through Missouri, Illinois and Indiana, killing 695 people and injuring 2,027. It hits the towns of Murphysboro, Illinois; West Frankfort, Illinois; Gorham, Illinois; Ellington, Missouri; and Griffin, Indiana.
 March 31 – The Bauhaus closes in Weimar and moves to a building in Dessau designed by Walter Gropius.

April

 April–October – The  is held in Paris, giving a name to the Art Deco style.
 April 1
 Frank Heath and his horse Gypsy Queen leaves Washington, D.C. to begin a two-year journey to visit all 48 states.
 The Patent and Trademark Office is transferred to the Department of Commerce.
 April 10 – F. Scott Fitzgerald publishes The Great Gatsby.
 April 15 – Fritz Haarmann, a serial killer convicted of the murder of 24 boys and young men, is beheaded in Germany.

 April 16 – The Communist assault on St Nedelya Church claims roughly 150 lives in Sofia, Bulgaria.
 April 19 – Colo-colo, a well-known football club of Chile, is founded in Macul, suburb of Santiago.
 April 20 – Iranian forces of Rezā Shāh occupies Ahvaz and arrests Sheikh Khaz'al.
 April 28 – Presenting the Stanley Baldwin government's budget, Chancellor of the Exchequer Winston Churchill announces Britain's return to the gold standard.

May

 May 1
 In the Destruction of early Islamic heritage sites in Saudi Arabia, the al-Baqi' mausoleums are destroyed by King Ibn Saud.
 Barcelona S.C. founded in Ecuador.
 The All-China Federation of Trade Unions, the world's largest trade union organisation, is founded in Guangzhou, Republic of China.
 May 5
 Scopes Trial: Dayton, Tennessee, biology teacher John T. Scopes is arrested for teaching Charles Darwin's Theory of Evolution.
 The General Election Law is passed in Japan.
 May 8 – African American Tom Lee rescues 32 people from the sinking steamboat M.E. Norman on the Mississippi River.
 May 16 – The first modern performance of Claudio Monteverdi's opera Il ritorno d'Ulisse in patria occurred in Paris.
 May 25
 Scopes Trial: John T. Scopes is indicted for teaching Darwin's theory of evolution.
 The National Forensic League is founded.
 May 29 – British explorer Percy Fawcett sends a last telegram to his wife before he disappears in the Amazon.

June

 June 6 – The Chrysler Corporation is founded by Walter Percy Chrysler.
 June 13 – Charles Francis Jenkins achieves the first synchronized transmission of pictures and sound, using 48 lines and a mechanical system in "the first public demonstration of radiovision".
 June 14
 The Aristotle University of Thessaloniki in Greece is founded.
 The Turkish football club Göztepe is founded.
 June 29 – The 6.8  Santa Barbara earthquake affects the central coast of California with a maximum Mercalli intensity of IX (Violent), destroying much of downtown Santa Barbara, California and leaving 13 people dead.

July

 July 7 New York City Police Department Emergency Service Unit is created as the Emergency Automobile Squad.
 July 9 – In Dublin, Ireland, Oonagh Keogh becomes the first female member of a stock exchange in the world.
 July 10
 Scopes Trial: In Dayton, Tennessee, the so-called "Monkey Trial" begins with John T. Scopes, a young high school science teacher accused of teaching evolution in violation of a Tennessee state law.
 Meher Baba begins his 44-year silence.
 July 18 – Adolf Hitler publishes Volume 1 of his personal manifesto Mein Kampf.
 July 21 
 Malcolm Campbell becomes the first man to exceed  on land.
 Scopes Trial: In Dayton, Tennessee, high school biology teacher John T. Scopes is found guilty of teaching evolution in class and fined $100.
 July 25 – The Telegraph Agency of the Soviet Union (TASS) is established.

August 

 August 1 – The New Cape Central Railway between Worcester and Voorbaai is incorporated into the South African Railways.
 August 8 – The Ku Klux Klan, the largest fraternal racist organization in the United States, demonstrates its popularity by holding a parade with an estimated 30,000-35,000 marchers in Washington DC.
 August 14 – The original Hetch Hetchy Moccasin Powerhouse is completed and goes on line.
 August 25 – The French complete their evacuation of the Ruhr region of Germany.
 August 31 – Anthropologist Margaret Mead lands in American Samoa to begin nine-months of field work that will culminate in her 1928 book Coming of Age in Samoa. The bestselling book will become the first popular anthropological study and will change many attitudes towards tribal peoples.

September

 September 3 – The U.S. Navy dirigible Shenandoah breaks up in a squall line near Caldwell, Ohio, killing 14 crewmen.
 September 27 – Feast of the Cross according to the Old Calendar; A celestial cross appears over Athens, Greece, while the Greek police pursues a group of Greek Old Calendarists. The phenomenon lasts for half an hour.

October

 October – The major money forgery and fraud of Alves dos Reis is exposed in Portugal.
 October 1 – Mount Rushmore National Memorial is dedicated in South Dakota.

 October 2 – In London, UK, John Logie Baird successfully transmits the first television pictures with a greyscale image.
 October 4 – S2, a Finnish Sokol class torpedo boat, was sunk during a fierce storm near the coast of Pori in the Gulf of Bothnia,  taking with the whole crew of 53.
 October 5–16 – The Locarno Treaties are negotiated.
October 6 — Xavier University of Louisiana, America's first and only historically-Black Catholic university is founded in New Orleans, Louisiana. In 2000, it became the only Catholic university founded by a saint. (Another university's founder was canonized in 2006.)
 October 8 – Cubana de Aviación is founded.
 October 15 – The Pittsburgh Pirates become the first MLB franchise to recover from a 3-games-to-1 deficit by defeating the Washington Senators to win the 1925 World Series.

November

 November 5 – Secret agent Sidney Reilly is executed by the OGPU, the secret police of the Soviet Union.
 November 9 – Formal foundation date of the Schutzstaffel (SS) as a personal bodyguard for Adolf Hitler in Germany.
 November 14 
 1925 Australian federal election: Stanley Bruce's Nationalist/Country Coalition Government is re-elected with an increased majority, defeating the Labor Party led by Matthew Charlton.
 The first Surrealist art exhibition opens in Paris.
 November 17 – The New Zealand and South Seas International Exhibition, a world's fair, opens in Dunedin, New Zealand.
 November 24 – The silent film El Húsar de la Muerte is released in Santiago, Chile.
 November 26 – Prajadhipok (Rama VII) is crowned as King of Siam.
 November 28 – The weekly country music-variety radio program Grand Ole Opry is first broadcast on WSM radio in Nashville, Tennessee, as the "WSM Barn Dance".

December

 December 1 – The Locarno Treaties are signed in London.
December 11 – Pope Pius XI's encyclical Quas primas, on the Feast of Christ the King, is promulgated.
 December 16
 Reza Shah becomes shah of Persia.
 Alpha Phi Omega, a National service fraternity, is founded at Lafayette College.
 Colombo Radio launches in Ceylon; the station subsequently becomes known as Radio Ceylon.
 December 25 – IG Farben is formed by the merger of six chemical companies in Germany.

Date unknown
 Spring – Leica I 35 mm film still camera is introduced commercially in Germany.
 The Australian state of Queensland introduces a 44-hour working week.
 The Brisbane City Council, (Australia), is created from the amalgamation of 20 smaller cities, towns and shires.
 New York City becomes the largest city in the world, taking the lead from London.
 Lion Feuchtwanger's novel Jud Süß (translated as Jew Süss or Power) is published in Germany.
 Ernest Blythe, Minister for Finance in the Irish Free State, arranges an annual government subsidy of £850 for the Abbey Theatre in Dublin, making it the first state-supported theatre in the English-speaking world.
 The Shueisha Publishing Company is founded in Tokyo.
 Wheel gymnastics is invented in Germany.

Births

January

 January 1 – Paul Bomani, Tanzanian politician and ambassador (d. 2005)
 January 4 – Veikko Hakulinen, Finnish cross-country skier (d. 2003)
 January 6 – John DeLorean, American car maker (d. 2005)
 January 7 
 Gerald Durrell, British naturalist, zookeeper, author and television presenter (d. 1995)
 Harry Stradling Jr., American cinematographer (d. 2017)
 January 8 – Bernardo Ruiz, Spanish road cycling racer
 January 9 – Lee Van Cleef, American actor (d. 1989)
 January 10 – Peter Colotka, Slovak academic, lawyer and politician, Prime Minister 1969–1988 (d. 2019)
 January 12 – Katherine MacGregor, American actress (d. 2018) 
 January 13
 Rosemary Murphy, American actress (d. 2014)
 Gwen Verdon, American actress and dancer (d. 2000)
 January 14 – Yukio Mishima, Japanese writer (d. 1970)
 January 15 
 August Englas, Estonian wrestler (d. 2017)
 Ignacio López Tarso, Mexican actor (d. 2023) 
 January 16 – Shafik Wazzan, 27th Prime Minister of Lebanon (d. 1999)
 January 17 – Duane Hanson, American sculptor (d. 1996)
 January 20 – Ernesto Cardenal, Nicaraguan priest, poet and politician (d. 2020)
 January 21 – Charles Aidman, American actor (d. 1993)
 January 24 – Maria Tallchief, American ballerina (d. 2013)
 January 25 – Barbara Carroll, American jazz pianist (d. 2017)
 January 26
 Joan Leslie, American actress (d. 2015)
 Paul Newman, American actor, film director, entrepreneur and philanthropist (d. 2008)
 January 27 – Sufi Abu Taleb, President of Egypt (d. 2008)
 January 29
 Dub Garrett, American football guard (d. 1976)
 Robert W. McCollum, American epidemiologist (d. 2010)
 January 30 – Douglas Engelbart, American inventor (d. 2013)
 January 31 
 Bernardino Rivera Álvarez, Bolivian bishop (d. 2010)
 Micheline Lannoy, Belgian figure skater

February

 February 2 – Elaine Stritch, American actress (d. 2014)
 February 3
 Shelley Berman, American comedian and actor (d. 2017)
 John Fiedler, American actor (d. 2005)
 Leon Schlumpf, Swiss Federal Councillor (d. 2012)
 February 4 
 Arne Åhman, Swedish athlete (d. 2022)
 Jutta Hipp, German born American jazz pianist and composer (d. 2003)
 February 8 – Jack Lemmon, American actor and film director (d. 2001)
 February 10
Dhalia, Indonesian actress (d. 1991)
Pierre Mondy, French film and theatre actor and director (d. 2012)
Daisy Myers, African American educator (d. 2011)
 February 11
 Virginia E. Johnson, American sexologist (d. 2013)
 Amparo Rivelles, Spanish actress (d. 2013)
 Kim Stanley, American actress (d. 2001)
 February 16 – Romolo Bizzotto, Italian professional football player and coach (d. 2017)
 February 17
 Ron Goodwin, English composer and conductor (d. 2003)
 Hal Holbrook, American actor (d. 2021)
 February 18
 Abdelsalam al-Majali, 60th and 63rd Prime Minister of Jordan (d. 2023)
 Ghafar Baba, Malaysian politician (d. 2006)
 George Kennedy, American actor (d. 2016)
 Krishna Sobti, Indian Hindi-language fiction writer and essayist (d. 2019)
 February 20 – Robert Altman, American film director (d. 2006)
 February 21
 Sam Peckinpah, American film director (d. 1984)
 Štefan Vrablec, Slovak Roman Catholic prelate (d. 2017)
 February 23 – Eric Prabhakar, Indian sprinter (d. 2011)
 February 25
 Maddy English, American female baseball player (d. 2004)
 Lisa Kirk, American actress and singer (d. 1990)
 Eduardo Risso, Uruguayan rower (d. 1986)
 Shehu Shagari, President of Nigeria (1979–83) (d. 2018)
 February 26 – Everton Weekes, West Indian cricketer (d. 2020)
 February 28 – Louis Nirenberg, Canadian-American mathematician (d. 2020)

March

 March 1 
 Keith Harvey Miller, American politician (d. 2019)
 Alexandre do Nascimento, Angolan prelate
 March 4
 Inezita Barroso, Brazilian singer, guitarist, actress, TV presenter (d. 2015)
 Alan R. Battersby, English organic chemist (d. 2018)
 Paul Mauriat, French musician (Love is Blue) (d. 2006)
 March 7 – Josef Ertl, German politician (d. 2000)
 March 8 
 John Harland Bryant, American physician (d. 2017)
 Dennis Lotis, South African-English singer and actor (d. 2023)
 Marta Lynch, Argentinian writer (d. 1985)
 March 12 
 Leo Esaki, Japanese physicist, Nobel Prize laureate
 G. William Whitehurst, American journalist and politician 
 March 13 – John Tate, American mathematician (d. 2019)
 March 15 – Art Murakowski, American football player (d. 1985)
 March 16
 Mary Hinkson, African-American dancer and choreographer (d. 2014)
 Luis E. Miramontes, Mexican chemist (d. 2004)
 March 17 – Gabriele Ferzetti, Italian actor (d. 2015)
 March 18 – Alessandro Alessandroni, Italian musician and composer (d. 2017)
 March 19 – Brent Scowcroft, American general and diplomat  (d. 2020)
 March 21 – Peter Brook, English theatre director (d. 2022)
 March 22 – Gerard Hoffnung, German-born English humorist (d. 1959)
 March 23 
 Robie Lester, American Grammy-nominated voice artist and singer (d. 2005)
 David Watkin, British cinematographer (d. 2008)
 March 25
 Flannery O'Connor, American writer (d. 1964)
 Kishori Sinha, Indian politician (d. 2016)
 March 26 
 Pierre Boulez, French composer (d. 2016)
 Ted Graham, Baron Graham of Edmonton, English politician (d. 2020)
 March 27 – Henry Plumb, Baron Plumb, English farmer and politician (d. 2022) 
 March 28 – Raja Perempuan Budriah, Malaysian royal consort (d. 2008)
 March 29 – David Tsimakuridze, Georgian freestyle wrestler (d. 2006)

April

 April 1 – Piero Livi, Italian director and screenwriter (d. 2015)
 April 3 
 Tony Benn, British politician (d. 2014)
 Jan Merlin, American actor, screenwriter and author (d. 2019)
 April 4 – Serge Dassault, French businessman and politician (d. 2018)
 April 7 – Chaturanan Mishra, Indian politician (d. 2011)
 April 13 – Michael Halliday, English-Australian linguist (d. 2018)
 April 14
 Gene Ammons, American jazz saxophonist (d. 1974)
 Abel Muzorewa, Zimbabwean politician (d. 2010)
 Rod Steiger, American actor (d. 2002)
 April 15 
 Milton J. Rosenberg, American psychology professor (d. 2018)
 Zdeněk Růžička, Czech Olympic gymnast (d. 2021)
 Beryl Te Wiata, New Zealand actor, author and scriptwriter (d. 2017)
 April 17 – René Moawad, 13th president of Lebanon (d. 1989)
 April 18 – Bob Hastings, American actor (d. 2014)
 April 19
 Hugh O'Brian, American soldier and actor (d. 2016)
 John Kraaijkamp Sr., Dutch actor and comedian (d. 2011)
 April 20 
 Elena Verdugo, American actress (d. 2017)
 Bob Will, American rower (d. 2019)
 April 21 
 Anthony Mason, Australian judge
 Sibghatullah Mojaddedi, acting President of Afghanistan (d. 2019)
 Solomon Perel, Israeli motivational speaker (d. 2023)
 April 22 – George Cole, English actor (d. 2015)
 April 24 – Eugen Weber, Romanian-born historian (d. 2007)
 April 25 
 Tony Christopher, Baron Christopher, English businessman 
 Janete Clair, Brazilian television, radio play and novel writer (d. 1983)
 Louis O'Neill, Canadian politician (d. 2018)
 April 26 
 Vladimir Boltyansky, Russian mathematician, educator and author (d. 2019)
 Michele Ferrero, Italian businessman (d. 2015)
 Jørgen Ingmann, Danish musician (d. 2015)
 April 29
 John Compton, Saint Lucian lawyer and politician, 1st prime minister of Saint Lucia (d. 2007)
 Iwao Takamoto, Japanese-American animator (d. 2007)

May

 May 1
 Scott Carpenter, American astronaut (d. 2013)
 Anna May Hutchison, American professional baseball player (d. 1998)
 May 2
 Maria Barroso, Portuguese politician and actress (d. 2015)
 Inga Gill, Swedish actress (d. 2000)
 John Neville, English actor (d. 2011)
 Mãe Stella de Oxóssi, Brazilian Ialorixá and writer (d. 2018)
 May 3 – Ngiratkel Etpison, 5th president of Palau (d. 1997)
 May 4
 Syed Ahmad Syed Mahmud Shahabuddin, Malaysian politician (d. 2008)
 Jenő Buzánszky, Hungarian footballer (d. 2015)
 Maurice R. Greenberg, American business executive 
 May 8 – Ali Hassan Mwinyi, 2nd President of Tanzania
 May 9 – Vladimir Tadej, Croatian production designer, screenwriter and film director (d. 2017)
 May 10 – Ilie Verdeț, 51st prime minister of Romania (d. 2001)
 May 12 – Yogi Berra, American baseball player (d. 2015)
 May 14 – Oona O'Neill, American actress (d. 1991)
 May 15 – Andrei Eshpai, Russian pianist (d. 2015)
 May 16 
 Nancy Roman, American astronomer (d. 2018)
 Ola Vincent, Nigerian economist and banker (d. 2012)
 May 18 – Gérard Corboud, Swiss entrepreneur, art collector and philanthropist (d. 2017)
 May 19
 Malcolm X, African-American civil rights activist (d. 1965)
 Pol Pot, Cambodian Stalinist dictator and leader of the Khmer Rouge (d. 1998)
 May 20 – Gregory Yong, Archbishop of Singapore (d. 2008)
 May 22
 Julio Garrett Ayllón, 33rd Vice President of Bolivia (d. 2018)
 James King, American tenor (d. 2005)
 Jean Tinguely, Swiss painter and sculptor (d. 1991)
 May 23 – Joshua Lederberg, American molecular biologist, recipient of the Nobel Prize in Physiology or Medicine (d. 2008) 
 May 24 – Mai Zetterling, Swedish actress and film director (d. 1994)
 May 25
 Jeanne Crain, American actress (d. 2003)
 José María Gatica, Argentine boxer (d. 1963)
 Rudolf Scheurer, Swiss football referee (d. 2015)
 May 26
 Alec McCowen, English actor (d. 2017)
 Carmen Montejo, Cuban-born Mexican actress (d. 2013)
 May 28
 Bülent Ecevit, 3-time prime minister of Turkey (d. 2006)
 Dietrich Fischer-Dieskau, German lyric baritone and conductor (d. 2012)
 Lucien Nedzi, American politician 
 Pavel Štěpán, Czech pianist (d. 1998)
 May 30 – John Marks, English doctor and author (d. 2022)
 May 31 
 Julian Beck, American actor, director, poet and painter (d. 1985)
 Frei Otto, German architect (d. 2015)
 Donn A. Starry, American army officer (d. 2011)

June

 June 2 
 Julius Blank, semiconductor pioneer (d. 2011)
 Buddy Elias, Swiss actor and president of the Anne Frank Fonds (d. 2015)
 June 3 – Tony Curtis, American actor (d. 2010)
 June 4 – Antonio Puchades, Spanish footballer (d. 2013)
 June 5 – Bill Hayes, American actor 
 June 6 – Hideji Ōtaki, Japanese actor (d. 2012)
 June 7 – Ernestina Herrera de Noble, Argentine publisher and executive (d. 2017)
 June 8 – Barbara Bush, First Lady of the United States (d. 2018)
 June 10
 Fortunato Abat, Filipino army general and politician (d. 2018)
 Nat Hentoff, American historian, novelist, jazz and country music critic and syndicated columnist (d. 2017)
 June 11 – William Styron, American writer (d. 2006)
 June 12 – Raphaël Géminiani, French road cycling racer
 June 13 – Dušan Trbojević, Serbian pianist, composer, musical writer and university professor (d. 2011)
 June 14
 Hideyuki Fujisawa, Japanese professional Go player (d. 2009)
 Pierre Salinger, White House Press Secretary (d. 2004)
 June 15
 Richard Baker, English broadcast journalist and author (d. 2018)
 Vasily Golubev, Soviet, Russian painter (d. 1985)
 Attilâ İlhan, Turkish poet, novelist, essayist, journalist and reviewer (d. 2005)
 June 16 – Jean d'Ormesson, French novelist (d. 2017)
 June 17
 Luce d'Eramo, Italian writer and literary critic (d. 2001)
 Mervyn Finlay, Australian member of the Supreme Court of New South Wales and Queen's Counsel (d. 2014)
 June 20
 András Kovács, Hungarian filmmaker (d. 2017)
 Audie Murphy, American World War II hero and actor (d. 1971)
 June 21
 Larisa Avdeyeva, Russian mezzo-soprano (d. 2013)
 Jean-Gabriel Castel, French-Canadian law professor
 Giovanni Spadolini, Prime Minister of Italy (d. 1994)
 Maureen Stapleton, American actress (d. 2006)
 June 23 – Oliver Smithies, British-American geneticist (d. 2017)
 June 25
 John Briley, American writer (d. 2019)
 June Lockhart, American actress
 Robert Venturi, American architect (d. 2018)
 P. Viswambharan, Indian politician, socialist, trade unionist and journalist (d. 2016)
 June 26 – Jean Frydman, French resistant and businessman (d. 2021)
 June 29
 Giorgio Napolitano, Italian politician and 11th President of Italy
 Cara Williams, American actress (d. 2021)
 June 30
 Ebrahim Amini, Iranian politician (d. 2020)
 Philippe Jaccottet, Swiss poet and translator (d. 2021)
 Ros Mey, Cambodian-born American Buddhist monk and survivor of the Khmer Rouge regime (d. 2010)
 Fred Schaus, American basketball player, head coach and athletic director (d. 2010)

July

 July 1 
 Farley Granger, American actor (d. 2011)
 Art McNally, American football referee (d. 2023)
 July 2 
 Marvin Rainwater, American country and rockabilly singer and songwriter (d. 2013)
 Medgar Evers, African-American civil rights activist (d. 1963)
 Patrice Lumumba, Congolese independence leader (d. 1961)
 July 3 
 Roger Chesneau, French steeplechaser (d. 2012)
 Keiji Hase, Japanese swimmer
 July 4 
 Dorothy Head Knode, American tennis player (d. 2015)
 Ciril Zlobec, Slovene poet, writer, translator, journalist and politician (d. 2018)
 July 5 
 Jean Raspail, French author, traveler and explorer (d. 2020)
 Fernando de Szyszlo, Peruvian painter, sculptor, printmaker and teacher (d. 2017)
 Unto Wiitala, Finnish ice hockey player (d. 2019)
 July 6
 Ruth Cracknell, Australian actress and author (d. 2002)
 Merv Griffin, American game show host and producer, talk show host, singer (d. 2007)
 Bill Haley, American musician (d. 1981)
 Gazi Yaşargil, Turkish scientist and neurosurgeon
 July 8 – Nicholas Brathwaite, Prime Minister of Grenada (d. 2016)
 July 9 
 Mary de Rachewiltz, Italian-American poet and translator
 Borislav Stanković, Serbian basketball player and coach (d. 2020)
 July 10 – Mahathir Mohamad, Malaysian politician; Former prime minister of Malaysia
 July 11
 Mattiwilda Dobbs, African-American coloratura soprano (d. 2015)
 Nicolai Gedda, Swedish operatic tenor (d. 2017)
 Fernando Matthei, Chilean Air Force General (d. 2017)
 July 12 – Don Campbell, Canadian ice hockey (d. 2012)
 July 13 
 Huang Zongying, Chinese actress and writer (d. 2020)
 Suzanne Zimmerman, American competition swimmer and Olympic medalist (d. 2021)
 July 14
 Francisco Álvarez Martínez, Roman Catholic prelate (d. 2022)
 Elmo Bovio, Argentine professional football player (d. 2017)
 Carlos Velázquez, Argentine modern pentathlete
 July 15 
 D. A. Pennebaker, American documentary filmmaker (d. 2019)
 Badal Sarkar, Indian dramatist and theatre director (d. 2011)
 July 16 – Rosita Quintana, Argentine actress (d. 2021)
 July 17
 Anita Lasker-Wallfisch, German cellist and Holocaust survivor 
 Mohammad Hasan Sharq, Afghan politician
 Ted Vogel, American marathon runner (d. 2019)
 July 18
Allan Elsom, New Zealand rugby union player (d. 2010)
 Raymond Jones, Australian architect (d. 2022)
 Shirley Strickland, Australian Olympic athlete (d. 2004)
 Friedrich Zimmermann, German politician (d. 2012)
 July 19
 Otto Arosemena, 32nd president of Ecuador (d. 1984)
 Henri Beaujean, French politician (d. 2021)
 John Dossetor, Canadian physician and bioethicist (d. 2020)
 Jean-Pierre Faye, French philosopher, poet and writer 
 Jack Petchey, English businessman and philanthropist 
 Michael Pfeiffer, German footballer (d. 2018)
 Sue Thompson, American singer (d. 2021)
 July 20
 Jacques Delors, French politician
 Frantz Fanon, French-Algerian psychiatrist and philosopher (d. 1961)
 Stan Hovdebo, New Democratic Party member of the Canadian House of Commons (d. 2018)
 Eric Watson, New Zealand cricketer (d. 2017)
 July 21 
 Hans Meyer, South African actor (d. 2020)
 Johnny Peirson, Canadian ice hockey player (d. 2021)
 July 22 – Joseph Sargent, American film director (d. 2014)
 July 23 
 Tajuddin Ahmad, 1st prime minister of Bangladesh (d. 1975)
 Gloria DeHaven, American actress (d. 2016)
 Quett Masire, 2nd President of Botswana (d. 2017)
 Govind Talwalkar, Indian journalist (d. 2017)
 July 24
 Stephen Porter, American stage director (d. 2013)
 Miiko Taka, American actress (d. 2023)
 July 25 
 Jutta Zilliacus, Finnish journalist and politician 
 Ana González de Recabarren, Chilean human rights activist (d. 2018)
 July 26 
 Robert Hirsch, French actor (d. 2017)
 Ana María Matute, Spanish writer (d. 2014)
 July 28
 Baruch S. Blumberg, American scientist, recipient of the Nobel Prize in Physiology or Medicine (d. 2011)
 Ali Bozer, Turkish politician (d. 2020)
 July 29
 Shivram Dattatreya Phadnis, Indian cartoonist
 Carmen Stănescu, Romanian actress (d. 2018)
 Mikis Theodorakis, Greek composer (d. 2021)
 July 31 – Carmel Quinn, Irish-American singer (d. 2021)

August

 August 1
 Cor Edskes, Dutch organ builder and restorer (d. 2015)
 Pam Gems, English playwright (d. 2011)
 August 2
 Princess Marie Gabriele of Luxembourg, Princess of Luxembourg (d. 2023)
 Jorge Rafael Videla, 42nd president of Argentina (d. 2013)
 Alan Whicker, British television presenter (d. 2013)
 August 3 – Dom Um Romão, Brazilian jazz drummer (d. 2005)
 August 4 – Betty Trezza, Italian-American female professional baseball player (d. 2007)
 August 6
 Eddie Baily, England international footballer (d. 2010)
 Barbara Bates, American actress and singer (d. 1969)
 Lilyan Chauvin, French-American actress (d. 2008)
 Olavi Rokka, American gardener and horticulturist (d. 2011)
 August 7 – M. S. Swaminathan, Indian scientist
 August 8 
 Alija Izetbegović, President of Bosnia-Herzegovina (d. 2003)
 Frank Lauterbur, American football player and coach (d. 2013)
 Aziz Sattar, Malaysian actor, comedian, singer and director (d. 2014)
 August 9
 David A. Huffman, American computer scientist (d. 1999)
 Valentín Pimstein, Chilean-Mexican producer of telenovelas (d. 2017)
 Olavi Rokka, Finnish modern pentathlete (d. 2011)
 Ginny Tyler, American voice actress (d. 2012)
 August 10 – Stanislav Brebera, Czech chemist (d. 2012)
 August 11 – Arlene Dahl, American actress (d. 2021)
 August 12
 Thor Vilhjálmsson, Icelandic writer (d. 2011)
 Guillermo Cano Isaza, Colombian journalist (d. 1986)
 Leopold Barschandt, Austrian footballer (d. 2000)
 George Wetherill, geophysicist (d. 2006)
 Dale Bumpers, American politician (d. 2016)
 August 13 
 José Alfredo Martínez de Hoz, Argentine executive and policy maker (d. 2013)
 Peter Beaven, New Zealand architect based in Christchurch (d. 2012)
 August 15
 Mike Connors, American actor (d. 2017)
 Oscar Peterson, Canadian jazz pianist (d. 2007)
 Aldo Ciccolini, Italian-born French pianist (d. 2015)
 August 16 – Kirke Mechem, American composer 
 August 18 – Pegeen Vail Guggenheim, Swiss-American painter (d. 1967)
 August 19 – Madhav Dalvi, Indian cricketer (d. 2012)
 August 20 – Henning Larsen, Danish architect (d. 2013)
 August 21 – Toma Caragiu, Romanian theatre, television and film actor (d. 1977)
 August 22
 Honor Blackman, English actress (d. 2020)
 Terry Donahue, Canadian female professional baseball player (d. 2019)
 August 25 
 Thea Astley, Australian writer (d. 2004)
 Hilmar Hoffmann, German film and culture academic (d. 2018)
 Hasan Tiro, Indonesian politician (d. 2010)
 August 26 
 Jack Hirshleifer, American economist (d. 2005)
 Etelka Keserű, Hungarian economist and politician (d. 2018)
 August 27
 Andrea Cordero Lanza di Montezemolo, Italian Roman Catholic cardinal and Vatican diplomat (d. 2017)
 Nat Lofthouse, English footballer (d. 2011)
 Jaswant Singh Neki, Indian academic and poet (d. 2015)
 August 28
 Antônio Agostinho Marochi, Brazilian bishop (d. 2018)
 Donald O'Connor, American actor, singer and dancer (d. 2003)
 José Parra Martínez, Spanish footballer (d. 2016)
 Philip Purser, English television critic and novelist (d. 2022)
 August 29
 Dick Cusack, American actor, filmmaker and humorist (d. 2003)
 Demetrio B. Lakas, President of Panama (d. 1999)
 August 31 – Maurice Pialat, French actor and director (d. 2003)

September

 September 1 
 Michael J. Cleary, Irish Roman Catholic bishop (d. 2020)
 Arvonne Fraser, American women's rights activist (d. 2018)
 September 3 – Shoista Mullojonova, Tajik-born Shashmakom singer (d. 2010)
 September 5 – Patrick Leo McCartie, English Roman Catholic bishop (d. 2020)
 September 6 – Andrea Camilleri, Italian writer and director (d. 2019)
 September 7 – Laura Ashley, Welsh designer (d. 1985)
 September 8 
 Jacqueline Ceballos, American feminist 
 Peter Sellers, English comedian and actor (d. 1980)
 September 10 
 Dick Lucas, American minister and cleric
 Boris Alexandrovich Tchaikovsky, Russian composer (d. 1996)
 September 11 – Armando Monteiro Filho, Brazilian businessman, engineer and politician (d. 2018)
 September 13 – Mel Tormé, American musician (d. 1999)
 September 14 – Winston Cenac, 3rd prime minister of Saint Lucia (d. 2004)
 September 15
 John Eden, Baron Eden of Winton, English politician (d. 2020)
 Helle Virkner, Danish actress (d. 2009)
 Peggy Webber, American actress 
 September 16
 Martha Firestone Ford, American businesswoman 
 Eugene Garfield, American linguist and businessman (d. 2017)
 Charles Haughey, sixth Taoiseach (head of government of the Republic of Ireland) (d. 2006)
 B.B. King, American singer-songwriter and guitarist (d. 2015)
 Morgan Woodward, American actor (d. 2019)
 September 19 – Franklin Sousley, U.S. Marine flag raiser on Iwo Jima (d. 1945)
 September 20 – Ananda Mahidol, King Rama VIII of Siam (d. 1946)
 September 23 
 Angelo Acerbi, Italian Roman Catholic bishop
 Denis Twitchett, Cambridge scholar and Chinese historian (d. 2006)
 September 24 – Autar Singh Paintal, Indian medical scientist (d. 2004)
 September 25 
 Edwin N. Lightfoot, American chemical engineer (d. 2017)
 Paul B. MacCready Jr., American aeronautical engineer (d. 2007)
 Silvana Pampanini, Italian actress (d. 2016)
 September 26 – Marty Robbins, American singer-songwriter and racing driver (d. 1982)
 September 27 – Robert G. Edwards, British Nobel Prize-winning physiologist (d. 2013)
 September 28
 Cromwell Everson, South African composer (d. 1991)
 Carolyn Morris, American female professional baseball player (d. 1996)
 September 29 – John Tower, American politician (d. 1991)
 September 30 
 Joseph Hitti, Lebanese Roman Catholic bishop (d. 2022)
 Arkady Ostashev, Russian scientist and rocket engineer (d. 1998)

October

 October 1
 Abraham Louis Schneiders, Dutch writer and diplomat (d. 2020) 
 Yang Hyong-sop, North Korean politician (d. 2022)
 October 2 – José A. Martínez Suárez, Argentine film director and screenwriter (d. 2019)
 October 3 
 Simone Segouin (also known as Nicole Minet), French Resistance fighter and partisan (d. 2023)
 Gore Vidal, American author (d. 2012)
 October 4 – Fyodor Terentyev, Soviet Olympic cross-country skier (d. 1963)
 October 5 
 Gail Davis, American actress (d. 1997)
 Antoine Gizenga, Prime Minister of the Democratic Republic of the Congo (d. 2019)
 Herbert Kretzmer, South African-English journalist and songwriter (d. 2020)
 Murray Riley, Australian rower (d. 2020)
 October 6 – Hiroshi H. Miyamura, American Medal of Honour recipient (d. 2022)
 October 7 – Mildred Earp, American female professional baseball player (d. 2017)
 October 8 – Álvaro Magaña, 38th president of El Salvador (d. 2001)
 October 9 – Isyaku Rabiu, Nigerian businessman (d. 2018)
 October 11 – Elmore Leonard, American novelist (d. 2013)
 October 13
 Lenny Bruce, American comic (d. 1966)
 Carlos Robles Piquer, Spanish diplomat and politician (d. 2018)
 Margaret Thatcher, Prime Minister of the United Kingdom from 1979 to 1990 (d. 2013)
 October 14 – Phillip V. Tobias, South African palaeoanthropologist (d. 2012)
 October 15 – Bob Rowland Smith, Australian politician (d. 2012)
 October 16 
 Daniel J. Evans, American politician 
 Dame Angela Lansbury, Irish-British-born American actress (d. 2022)
 October 18 – Ramiz Alia, 13th president of Albania (d. 2011)
 October 19 
 Emilio Eduardo Massera, Argentine Naval military officer (d. 2010)
 Raymond Impanis, Belgian cyclist (d. 2010)
 October 20
 Art Buchwald, American humorist and columnist (d. 2007)
 Hiromu Nonaka, Japanese politician (d. 2018)
 Gene Wood, American game show announcer (d. 2004)
 October 21 
 Surjit Singh Barnala, Indian politician (d. 2017)
 Celia Cruz, Cuban-American singer (d. 2003)
 Virginia Zeani, Romanian soprano 
 October 22 
 Slater Martin, American basketball player and coach (d. 2012)
 Edith Kawelohea McKinzie, Hawaiian genealogist, author and hula expert (d. 2014)
 Robert Rauschenberg, American painter and graphic artist (d. 2008)
 October 23 
 Johnny Carson, American comedian and television host (d. 2005)
 José Freire Falcão, Brazilian cardinal (d. 2021)
 October 24
 Luciano Berio, Italian composer (d. 2003)
 Al Feldstein, American artist and comic book creator (d. 2014)
 Ieng Sary, Vietnamese-Cambodian politician (d. 2013)
 October 25 
 Aliya Moldagulova, Soviet soldier and sniper (d. 1944)
 John J. Snyder, American Roman Catholic bishop (d. 2019)
 October 27 
 Warren Christopher, American diplomat (d. 2011)
 Paul Fox, English television executive 
 Jiro Ono, Japanese chef 
 October 29
 Dominick Dunne, American writer, investigative journalist and producer (d. 2009)
 Robert Hardy, English actor (d. 2017)
 Klaus Roth, German-born British mathematician (d. 2015)
 October 31
 Ngaire Lane, New Zealand swimmer (d. 2021)
 John Pople, English chemist, Nobel Prize laureate (d. 2004)

November

 November 2 – Leif Hermansen, Danish rower (d. 2005)
 November 4 
 Kjerstin Dellert, Swedish opera singer (d. 2018)
 Doris Roberts, American actress (d. 2016)
 November 6 – Michel Bouquet, French actor (d. 2022)
 November 8 – Asunción Balaguer, Spanish actress (d. 2019)
 November 9 – Giovanni Coppa, Italian cardinal (d. 2016)
 November 10 – Richard Burton, Welsh actor, better known for his role in Cleopatra (d. 1984)
 November 11 
 Dame June Whitfield, English actress (d. 2018)
 Jonathan Winters, American actor and comedian (d. 2013)
 November 12 – Heinz Schubert, German actor (d. 1999)
 November 17 – Rock Hudson, American actor (d. 1985)
 November 19 – Zygmunt Bauman, Polish military officer, sociologist and philosopher (d. 2017)
 November 20
 Kaye Ballard, American actress, comedian and singer (d. 2019)
 Lise Bourdin, French actress 
 Robert F. Kennedy, American politician and Attorney General of the United States (d. 1968)
 Maya Plisetskaya, Russian-Lithuanian ballerina (d. 2015)
 November 22
 Carla Balenda, American actress 
 Miki Muster, Slovenian artist (d. 2018)
 Gunther Schuller, American musician (d. 2015)
 November 23 
 José Napoleón Duarte, Salvadoran politician, 39th President of El Salvador (d. 1990)
 Johnny Mandel, American composer and conductor (d. 2020)
 November 24
 William F. Buckley Jr., American journalist, author and commentator (d. 2008)
 Simon van der Meer, Dutch physicist, Nobel Prize laureate (d. 2011)
 November 26
 Gregorio Conrado Álvarez, Uruguayan general and dictator (d. 2016)
 Eugene Istomin, American pianist (d. 2003)
 November 27
 Claude Lanzmann, French filmmaker (d. 2018)
 Ernie Wise, English comedian (d. 1999)
 November 30 
 Maryon Pittman Allen, American politician and journalist (d. 2018)
 Hayashiya Sanpei I, Japanese comedian (d. 1980)

December

 December 1 – Martin Rodbell, American scientist, recipient of the Nobel Prize in Physiology or Medicine (d. 1998)
 December 2 – Julie Harris, American actress (d. 2013)
 December 3 – Erik Mørk, Danish actor (d. 1993)
 December 4 
 Lino Lacedelli, Italian mountaineer (d. 2009)
 Sauro Tomà, Italian footballer (d. 2018)
 December 5
 Henri Oreiller, French Olympic alpine skier (d. 1962)
 Anastasio Somoza Debayle, President of Nicaragua (d. 1980)
 December 6 – Shigeko Higashikuni, Japanese princess (d. 1961)
 December 7 – Hermano da Silva Ramos, French-Brazilian racing driver 
 December 8 
 Sammy Davis Jr., American singer, dancer, musician and actor (d. 1990)
 Arnaldo Forlani, 43rd prime minister of Italy
 December 11 
 Aaron Feuerstein, American businessman and philanthropist (d. 2021)
 John R. Gorman, American Roman Catholic bishop
 Paul Greengard, American neuroscientist, recipient of the Nobel Prize in Physiology or Medicine (d. 2019)
 December 12 
 Anne V. Coates, British film editor (d. 2018)
 Vladimir Shainsky, Soviet and Russian composer (d. 2017)
 December 13 – Dick Van Dyke, American actor, singer and dancer 
 December 15
 Trần Thiện Khiêm, Vietnamese politician (d. 2021)
 Hiroshi Motoyama, Japanese scientist (d. 2015)
 Kasey Rogers, American actress (d. 2006)
 December 19
 Rabah Bitat, Algerian politician, interim President of Algeria (d. 2000)
 Tankred Dorst, German playwright (d. 2017)
 Robert B. Sherman, American songwriter (d. 2012)
 December 20 – Béla Goldoványi, Hungarian athlete (d. 1972)
 December 22 – Ekaterina Mikhailova-Demina, military doctor and war heroine (d. 2019)
 December 23 – Pierre Bérégovoy, French politician, 111th Prime Minister of France (d. 1993)
 December 24 – Prosper Grech, Maltese cardinal (d. 2019)
 December 25 – Carlos Castaneda, American author (d. 1998)
 December 27
 Moshe Arens, Israeli diplomat and politician (d. 2019)
 Michel Piccoli, French actor, singer, director and producer (d. 2020)
 December 28
 Willy Kemp, Luxembourgian road cycling racer (d. 2021)
 Hildegard Knef, German actress, singer and writer (d. 2002)
 Milton Obote, President of Uganda (d. 2005)
 December 29
 Keshav Dutt, Indian field hockey player (d. 2021)
 Luis Alberto Monge, 39th President of Costa Rica (d. 2016)

Deaths

January
 January 5 – Yevgenia Bosch, Ukrainian politician (b. 1879)
 January 6 – Rafaela Porras Ayllón, Spanish Roman Catholic religious professed and saint (b. 1850)
 January 8 – George Bellows, American artist (b. 1882)
 January 14 – Camille Decoppet, Swiss Federal Councilor (b. 1862)
 January 16 – Aleksey Kuropatkin, Russian general and Imperial Russian Minister of War (b. 1848)
 January 18 
 Charles Lanrezac, French general (b. 1852)
 J. M. E. McTaggart, English philosopher (b. 1866)
 January 22 – Fanny Bullock Workman, American geographer, writer and mountain climber (b. 1859)
 January 25 – Alexander Kaulbars, Russian general and explorer (b. 1844)
 January 26 – Sir James Mackenzie, Scottish cardiologist (b. 1853)

February

 February 2 – Jaap Eden, Dutch speed skater (b. 1873)
 February 3 – Oliver Heaviside, British mathematician (b. 1850)
 February 4 – Robert Koldewey, German architect and archaeologist (b. 1855)
 February 11 – Aristide Bruant, French singer and nightclub owner (b. 1851)
 February 13 – Floyd Collins, American cave explorer (b. 1887)
 February 17 – Ignacio Andrade, Venezuela military and politician, 23rd President of Venezuela (b. 1839)
 February 18 – James Lane Allen, American writer (b. 1849)
 February 21 – Fernando De Lucia, Italian tenor (b. 1860)
 February 23 
 Samuel Berger, American Olympic boxer (b. 1884)
 James H. Wilson, American Union Army major general (b. 1837)
 February 24 – Hjalmar Branting, 19th Prime Minister of Sweden, recipient of the Nobel Peace Prize (b. 1860)
 February 25 – Louis Feuillade, French silent film director (b. 1873)
 February 28 – Friedrich Ebert, 1st President of Germany (1919–1945) (b. 1871)

March

 March 1 – Homer Plessy, American political activist (b. 1862 or 1863)
 March 2 
 William A. Clark, American entrepreneur and politician (b. 1839)
 Luigj Gurakuqi, Albanian writer and politician (b. 1879)
 March 4
 Moritz Moszkowski, Polish composer (b. 1854)
 James Ward, British philosopher and psychologist (b. 1843)
 John Montgomery Ward, American baseball player and MLB Hall of Famer (b. 1860)
 March 7 – Georgy Lvov, Prime Minister of Russia (b. 1861)
 March 8
 Manuel Míguez González, Spanish Roman Catholic priest and blessed (b. 1831) 
 Juliette Wytsman, Belgian painter (b. 1866)
 March 10 – Myer Prinstein, Polish-American track athlete (b. 1878)
 March 12 – Sun Yat-sen, Chinese physician, politician and revolutionary (b. 1866)
 March 13 – Lucille Ricksen, American silent film actress (b. 1910)
 March 14 – Walter Camp, American football coach (b. 1859)
 March 19 – Nariman Narimanov, Azerbaijani politician (b. 1870)
 March 20 – George Curzon, 1st Marquess Curzon of Kedleston, Viceroy of India (b. 1859)
 March 28 – Henry Rawlinson, 1st Baron Rawlinson, British general (b. 1864)
 March 30 – Rudolf Steiner, Austrian philosopher (b. 1861)

April

 April 7 – Patriarch Tikhon of Moscow, Patriarch of the Russian Orthodox Church (b. 1865)
 April 13 – Elwood Haynes, American inventor (b. 1857)
 April 14 – John Singer Sargent, American artist (b. 1856)
 April 15
 August Endell, German architect (b. 1871)
 Fritz Haarmann, German serial killer (executed) (b. 1879)
 April 16 – Günther Victor, Prince of Schwarzburg, German prince (b. 1852)
 April 17 – Wong Fei-hung, Chinese healer and revolutionary (b. 1847)
 April 19 – John Walter Smith, American politician (b. 1845)
 April 20 – Herbert Lawford, British tennis player (b. 1851)
 April 22 – André Caplet, French composer and conductor (b. 1878)

May

 May 2
 Johann Palisa, Austrian astronomer (b. 1848)
 Antun Branko Šimić, Croatian poet (b. 1898)
 May 3 – Clément Ader, French Army Captain and aviation pioneer (b. 1841)
 May 4 – Giovanni Battista Grassi, Italian physician and zoologist (b. 1854)
 May 5 – Catharine van Tussenbroek, Dutch physician (b. 1852)
 May 7
 William Lever, 1st Viscount Leverhulme, British industrialist, philanthropist and politician (b. 1851)
 Sir Doveton Sturdee, British admiral (b. 1859)
 May 10
 Alexandru Marghiloman, 25th prime minister of Romania (b. 1854)
 William Massey, 19th prime minister of New Zealand (b. 1856)
 May 12
 Amy Lowell, American poet (b. 1874)
 Charles Mangin, French general (b. 1866)
 May 13 – Alfred Milner, 1st Viscount Milner, British politician and colonial administrator (b. 1854)
 May 14 – H. Rider Haggard, British writer (b. 1856) 
 May 15 – Nelson A. Miles, American general (b. 1839)
 May 20
Ramón Auñón y Villalón, Spanish admiral and politician (b. 1844)
Elias M. Ammons, Governor of Colorado (b. 1860)
Joseph Howard, 1st Prime Minister of Malta (b. 1862)
 May 21 – Hidesaburō Ueno, Japanese agricultural scientist and guardian of Hachikō (b. 1871)
 May 22 – John French, 1st Earl of Ypres, British World War I field marshal (b. 1852)
 May 25 – Karl Abraham, German psychoanalyst (b. 1877)
 May 28 – João Pinheiro Chagas, Prime Minister of Portugal (b. 1863)
 May 29 – Percy Fawcett, British explorer, anthropologist and archaeologist (disappeared) (b. 1867)
 May 31 – John Palm, Curaçao-born composer (b. 1885)

June

 June 1
 Lucien Guitry, French actor (b. 1860)
 Thomas R. Marshall, 28th Vice President of the United States (b. 1854)
 June 2 – James Ellsworth, American mine owner and banker (b. 1849)
 June 3 – Camille Flammarion, French astronomer (b. 1842)
 June 9 – Antony MacDonnell, 1st Baron MacDonnell, Irish civil servant (b. 1844)
 June 12 – Mary Cole Walling, American patriot, lecturer (b. 1838)
 June 16 – Emmett Hardy, American jazz cornetist (b. 1903)
 June 17 – Adolf Pilar von Pilchau, Baltic German politician, regent of the United Baltic Duchy and baron (b. 1851)
 June 18 – Robert M. La Follette, American politician (b. 1855)
 June 20 – Josef Breuer, Austrian neurologist (b. 1842)
 June 22 – Felix Klein, German mathematician (b. 1849)
 June 28 – Georgina Febres-Cordero, Venezuelan nun (b. 1861)
 June 29 – Christian Michelsen, Norwegian politician and 1st Prime Minister of Norway (b. 1857)

July

 July 1 – Erik Satie, French composer (b. 1866)
 July 2 – Nikolai Golitsyn, last Prime Minister of the Russian Empire (executed) (b. 1850)
 July 4 – Pier Giorgio Frassati, Italian Roman Catholic social activist and blessed (b. 1901)
 July 7 – Clarence Hudson White, American photographer (b. 1871)
 July 14 – Pancho Villa, Filipino world boxing champion (b. 1901)
 July 17 – Lovis Corinth, German painter (b. 1858)
 July 19 – Francisco Jose Fernandes Costa, Portuguese lawyer and politician (b. 1867)
 July 26
 Antonio Ascari, Italian racing driver (b. 1888)
 William Jennings Bryan, American lawyer and politician (b. 1860) 
 Gottlob Frege, German mathematician and philosopher (b. 1848)

August

 August 4 – Charles W. Clark, American baritone (b. 1865)
 August 5 – Jennie Lee, American actress (b. 1848)
 August 6 – Gregorio Ricci-Curbastro, Italian mathematician (b. 1853)
 August 12 – Severo Fernández, 24th President of Bolivia (b. 1849)
 August 15 – Konrad Mägi, Estonian landscape painter (b. 1878)
 August 17 – Ioan Slavici, Romanian writer (b. 1848)
 August 20 – Liao Zhongkai, Chinese politician, Kuomintang leader and financier (b. 1877)
 August 25 – Franz Conrad von Hötzendorf, Austrian field marshal (b. 1852)

September
 September 7 – René Viviani, 81st Prime Minister of France (b. 1863)
 September 16 – Alexander Alexandrovich Friedman, Russian mathematician (b. 1888)
 September 17 – Carl Eytel, German-American artist working in Palm Springs, California (b. 1862)
 September 18 – Yui Mitsue, Japanese general (b. 1860)
 September 29 – Léon Bourgeois, French statesman, recipient of the Nobel Peace Prize (b. 1851)

October

 October 5 – Anna Schäffer, German Roman Catholic mystic, stigmatist and saint (b. 1882)
 October 7 – Christy Mathewson, American baseball player and MLB Hall of Famer (b. 1880)
 October 10 – James Buchanan Duke, American tobacco and electric power industrialist (b. 1856)
 October 14 – Eugen Sandow, German-born bodybuilder, physical culturist (b. 1867)
 October 15 – Dolores Jiménez y Muro, Mexican revolutionary and educator (b. 1848)
 October 20 – Jonah of Hankou, Russian Orthodox priest and saint (b. 1888)
 October 31
 George Anderson, Danish criminal (b. 1880)
 Mikhail Frunze, Russian Bolshevik leader (b. 1885)
 José Ingenieros, Argentine physician, sociologist and philosopher (b. 1877)
 Max Linder, French silent film actor (b. 1883)

November
 November 1 – Max Linder, French actor (b. 1883)
 November 5 – Sidney Reilly, Russian spy (executed) (b. c.1873)
 November 6 – Khải Định, Emperor of Vietnam (b. 1885)
 November 12 – Robert Wrenn, American tennis player (b. 1873)
 November 20 
 Queen Alexandra, consort of Edward VII of the United Kingdom (b. 1844)
 Clara Morris, Victorian stage actress (b. 1846)
 November 24 – Margaret Sinclair, British nun and venerable (b. 1900)
 November 26 – King Vajiravudh (Rama VI) of Siam (b. 1880)

December

 December 5
 Wilhelmina Drucker, Dutch politician and writer (b. 1847)
 Władysław Reymont, Polish writer, Nobel Prize laureate (b. 1867)
 December 8 – Marguerite Marsh, American actress (b. 1888)
 December 9 – Pablo Iglesias Posse, co-founder of the Spanish Socialist Workers Party (b. 1850)
 December 13 – Antonio Maura, Spanish conservative politician, 5-time Prime Minister of Spain (b. 1853)
 December 15 – Battling Siki, Senegalese boxer (b. 1897)
 December 18 – Sir Hamo Thornycroft, British sculptor (b. 1850)
 December 19 – José Ignacio Quintón, Puerto Rican composer and pianist (b. 1881)
 December 21
 Lottie Lyell, Australian female pioneer film director and producer (b. 1890)
 Jules Méline, French statesman, 50th Prime Minister of France (b. 1838)
 December 22
 Alice, Princess Dowager of Monaco, consort of Albert I of Monaco (b. 1858)
 Mary Thurman, American actress (b. 1895)
 December 25
 Karl Abraham, German psychoanalyst (b. 1877)
 Ester Rachel Kamińska, Polish actress, "mother of Yiddish theatre" (b. 1870)
 December 27 – Marie-Louise Jaÿ, French businesswoman (b. 1838)
 December 28
 Sergei Aleksandrovich Yesenin, Russian lyrical poet (b. 1895)
 Raymond P. Rodgers, American admiral (b. 1849)
 December 29 – Félix Vallotton, Swiss painter (b. 1865)
 December 31 – J. Gordon Edwards, Canadian film director (b. 1867)

Nobel Prizes

 Physics – James Franck and Gustav Ludwig Hertz
 Chemistry – Richard Adolf Zsigmondy
 Physiology or Medicine – not awarded
 Literature – George Bernard Shaw
 Peace – Austen Chamberlain and Charles Gates Dawes

References